The Criminal Courts of Justice is the principal courts building for the criminal courts in the Republic of Ireland.  It is on Parkgate Street, near the Phoenix Park.

History
The court building, which officially opened in January 2010, replaced the Four Courts and other buildings as the location for most criminal matters before the Dublin Metropolitan District Court and Dublin Circuit Court. The complex also houses the regular sittings of the Central Criminal Court, Special Criminal Court and is home to the criminal division of the Court of Appeal. The Four Courts and Green Street Court House are still used for civil cases.

In a change from previous older courts buildings in Ireland, the building has facilities to hold up to 100 prisoners in the basement, with separate entrances for each court. Jurors are also based in a separate part of the building with their own court entrances after being empanelled, in order to keep them separate from the public. Victims and victim support organisations also have use of a suite of rooms.

The building contains rooms for 150 barristers as well as offices for Gardaí, the Director of Public Prosecutions, Probation Service, Law Society of Ireland, judges' chambers, press rooms and court administration.

Gallery

References

Buildings and structures in Dublin (city)
Courthouses in the Republic of Ireland